Cui Zhe (born 1 December 1986 in Heze) is a powerlifter from China. At the 2012 Summer Paralympics she won a silver medal in the women's 40 kg powerlifting event, lifting .

She also won the silver medal in the women's 45 kg event at the 2020 Summer Paralympics held in Tokyo, Japan. A few months later, she won the gold medal in her event at the 2021 World Para Powerlifting Championships held in Tbilisi, Georgia.

References

External links
 

1986 births
Living people
Chinese powerlifters
Female powerlifters
Paralympic powerlifters of China
Paralympic silver medalists for China
Paralympic medalists in powerlifting
Powerlifters at the 2008 Summer Paralympics
Powerlifters at the 2012 Summer Paralympics
Powerlifters at the 2020 Summer Paralympics
Medalists at the 2008 Summer Paralympics
Medalists at the 2012 Summer Paralympics
Medalists at the 2020 Summer Paralympics
People from Heze
21st-century Chinese women